The following lists events that happened during 1993 in Chile.

Incumbents
President of Chile: Patricio Aylwin

Events 

 The Valdivia International Film Festival is held for the first time.

October
21 October – Apoquindo massacre

December
11 December – Chilean general election, 1993

Sport
 1993 Movistar Open
 Chile national football team 1993
 1993 Copa Chile

Births
2 August – Felipe Mora

Deaths
9 June – Juan Downey (born 1940)

References 

 
Years of the 20th century in Chile
Chile